Paul Langmack (born 10 May 1965) is an Australian former rugby league coach and representative and premiership-winning player. Langmack won three premierships with the Canterbury-Bankstown Bulldogs in the mid-eighties. He later joined the Western Suburbs Magpies to become just the fifth player to play 100 games with two different teams.

Playing career
While attending Fairfield Patrician Brothers, Langmack captained the Australian Schoolboys team in 1982.

Langmack won three premierships as a member of the Canterbury-Bankstown Bulldogs in 1984, 1985 and 1988, and later played for and captained Western Suburbs. In 1987, he became the youngest player in history to register 100 top-grade games at the age of 22 years 26 days. Langmack was named Rugby League Week player of the year in 1992. In 1999 former teammate Phil Gould brought Langmack to the Sydney City club, he played one final season – a season that didn't reach any great heights, only appearing in three first grade matches.

Coaching career

In 2002 he was a contender to replace Terry Lamb as the coach of the Wests Tigers and was reportedly the preferred candidate of senior players, including Terry Hill and Darren Senter. After the signing of Tim Sheens to the position, Langmack became assistant coach to Craig Coleman at the South Sydney Rabbitohs.

After Coleman was dramatically sacked immediately prior to the 2003 season, Langmack was installed as coach, but was unable to avoid the wooden spoon, winning just three games. After an unsuccessful start to the 2004 season, he was sacked and replaced by assistant Arthur Kitinas. Langmack's last season in charge of Souths was also marred by claims that Langmack was a racist by Souths player Owen Craigie.

References

External links
Canterbury Bulldogs profile

1965 births
Living people
Australian rugby league coaches
Australian rugby league players
Canterbury-Bankstown Bulldogs players
New South Wales City Origin rugby league team players
New South Wales Rugby League State of Origin players
Rugby league five-eighths
Rugby league locks
Rugby league second-rows
South Sydney Rabbitohs coaches
Sydney Roosters players
Western Suburbs Magpies players